Japanese hemlock may refer to:

 Tsuga diversifolia, or northern Japanese hemlock
 Tsuga sieboldii, or southern Japanese hemlock

See also
 Dendrolimus superans, or Japanese hemlock caterpillar
 Hemlock (disambiguation)